Sibleys railway station was a station in Sibleys Green, in the civil parish of Chickney, Essex. It closed for passengers in 1952.

References

External links
 Sibleys station on navigable 1946 O. S. map
 

Disused railway stations in Essex
Former Great Eastern Railway stations
Railway stations in Great Britain opened in 1913
Railway stations in Great Britain closed in 1952
1913 establishments in England
Uttlesford